Cyclopides is a genus of skippers. It is mentioned in the Sherlock Holmes book, The Hound of the Baskervilles by Sir Arthur Conan Doyle.

References

External links
Sherlock Holmes .com
 Descriptions of one hundred new species of Hesperidae, Parts 1–2, by W. C. Hewitson (1867)

Hesperiidae
Hesperiidae genera